The Roman Catholic Diocese of Santiago de Veraguas (erected 13 July 1963) is a suffragan diocese of the Archdiocese of Panamá. Appointed in April 2013, the current bishop is Audilio Aguilar Aguilar.

Current bishop

Appointment
On Tuesday, April 30, 2013, Pope Francis accepted the resignation from the pastoral care of the Roman Catholic Diocese of Santiago de Veraguas submitted by the fourth bishop of the diocese, Bishop Oscar Brown Mario Jiménez, in accordance with Canon 401.1 of the Western-rite 1983 Code of Canon Law. Pope Francis appointed Bishop Audilio Aguilar Aguilar, who until then had been serving as bishop of the Roman Catholic Diocese of Colón-Kuna Yala, Panama, to serve as the fifth bishop of the Roman Catholic Diocese of Santiago de Veraguas.

Biography
Bishop Audilio Aguilar Aguilar was born on August 4, 1963, in Cañazas, Panama, located in the Roman Catholic Diocese of Santiago de Veraguas. He completed his philosophical and theological studies in the major seminaries of the Roman Catholic Archdiocese of Guayaquil in Ecuador and the Roman Catholic Archdiocese of San José in Costa Rica. He earned a Licentiate of Canon Law at the Pontifical Lateran University in Rome, Italy. He was ordained a priest on August 4, 1990, and incardinated in the Roman Catholic Diocese of Santiago de Veraguas.

During his priestly ministry, he was spiritual director of the Diocesan Minor Seminary San Liborio, pastor of the Parish of San Francisco Javier in Cañazas, trainer and professor at the Major Seminary San Jose, Panama, assistant secretary of the Episcopal Conference of Panama, judge of the Ecclesiastical Court of Panama, pastor of the Parish of San Isidro Labrador in Sona, Panama, and parish priest of the Parish of San Miguel Arcangel (Saint Michael the Archangel) in Atalaya, Panama. On June 18, 2005, he was appointed bishop of the Roman Catholic Diocese of Colón - Kuna Yala by Pope Emeritus Benedict XVI, and on August 6, 2005, he was ordained a bishop. Since 2010, he has been serving as the vice president of the Episcopal Conference of Panama.

Ordinaries
Marcos Gregorio McGrath, C.S.C. (1964–1969), appointed Archbishop of Panamá
Martin Legarra Tellechea, O.A.R. (1969–1975)
José Dimas Cedeño Delgado (1975–1994), appointed Archbishop of Panamá
Oscar Brown Mario Jiménez (1994–2013)
Audilio Aguilar Aguilar (2013–present); previously, Bishop of the Roman Catholic Diocese of Colón-Kuna Yala, Panama

References

External links
 

Santiago de Veraguas
Santiago de Veraguas
Santiago de Veraguas
Santiago de Veraguas
Roman Catholic Ecclesiastical Province of Panamá